Steve Spill (born Steven Spillman; San Francisco, California; 3 January 1955) is an American magician and founder of Magicopolis,  a 150-seat theater that opened in 1998 in Santa Monica, California, where Spill performs sleight-of-hand and large-scale illusions. Spill's shows have been praised by critics,
theatergoers,
feature writers,
families,
tourists,
and magicians.

When Steve Spill was young, his father was night manager of the Magic Castle. It was there that Spill met influential magicians such as Dai Vernon and Charlie Miller. Prior to the opening of Magicopolis, Spill worked as a magic bartender at the Jolly Jester in Aspen, Colorado, c.1976–c.1980. Partner with Bob Sheets as "Sheets & Spill" c1978-85. Regular at Inn of Magic in Washington, DC, area 1981–85. Played Harrah's, Lake Tahoe, 1987–88. He has toured USA, South Africa (1990), the Caribbean (1993), Europe (1995), and Canada (1996). He wrote My Hands Can Be Yours (1973, 79pp), Imagine Magic (1974), Spill Bar & Grill (1980), and three cartoon booklets. On May 12, 2015, Spill's book I Lie for Money was published by Skyhorse Publishing.

Spill is known to magic aficionados
as a performer who innovates magical effects used by other magicians, such as his version of Bill in Lemon
and his Mindreading Goose.
He has been featured in industry journals such as Genii, MAGIC,
and M-U-M,
and created the DVDs Ten Years of Steve Spill 1980–1990
and Confessions of a Needle Swallower.  Spill lives with his wife Bozena in Los Angeles.

References

External links 
 
 LA Times Guide Entry
 The Magic Café Guest of Honor 2008

1955 births
Living people
American magicians
People from San Francisco